Benjamín Sagahón Medina (born 14 January 1960) is a Mexican politician affiliated with the Party of the Democratic Revolution. He served as Deputy of the LIX Legislature of the Mexican Congress representing San Luis Potosí. He also served as municipal president of Matlapa from 1997 to 2000.

References

1960 births
Living people
Politicians from San Luis Potosí
Institutional Revolutionary Party politicians
Party of the Democratic Revolution politicians
20th-century Mexican politicians
21st-century Mexican politicians
Municipal presidents in San Luis Potosí
Deputies of the LIX Legislature of Mexico
Members of the Chamber of Deputies (Mexico) for San Luis Potosí